Maralyn Thoma is an American television soap opera writer.

Early life
Thoma was born in Memphis, Tennessee and was raised in Houston, Texas. At age 15 she moved to Las Vegas and became a chorus girl at the Sahara Hotel. A year later, she returned to Houston to finish school and worked as one of eight summer stock theatre dancers. She pursued a dancer career in New York where she worked for 10 years performing in 5 Broadway shows. She relocated to Los Angeles along with her two children assuming that California is better for her and them.

Career
In 1980, Thoma became a secretary for Columbia Pictures. A year later, she was hired as the secretary to the head writer of General Hospital. Eventually, she became a writer for the show, earning 30 million viewers. Her favorite writing was for the episode where General Hospitals Anna fell in love with a man from another planet. While she was a writer for the show, she also did writing for the Days of Our Lives and Emmy-winning Santa Barbara before moving to James E. Reilly as a screenwriter for Passions in 1999.

In 1995, Thoma moved to Bend, Oregon where she founded 2nd Street Theater. In 2008 she produced Helen on Wheels. In that play, she played the lead role of Helen Wheeler, an old, drunk, and armed lady. In the following year, she was a co-host of Bend Follies, a comedy play which raised money for the Tower Theatre Foundation. In the play, she is joined by the executive director Chuck Arnold from Downtown Bend Business Association and Ray Solley, the Executive Director of the Tower Theatre Foundation. After 18 years of successful productions, 2nd Street Theater was closed and Maralyn moved to the Gulf Coast of Florida.

Positions held
Days of Our Lives
Breakdown writer: 1983 - 1985 (hired by Margaret DePriest)
Script writer: 1993 - 1999

General Hospital
Script writer: 1985-1988 (hired by Pat Falken Smith)
Associate head writer: 1989 - 1990
Head writer: 1992 - 1993

Santa Barbara
Associate head writer: 1991 - 1992
Head writer: 1990 - 1991

Man from Atlantis
Actress

Awards and nominations
Daytime Emmy Award: Her first nomination in 1984 was shared with Margaret DePriest, Sheri Anderson, Michael Robert David, Susan Goldberg, Bob Hansen, Leah Markus, and Dana Soloff.
Won, 1990, Best Writing,"Santa Barbara"
Won, 1991, Best Writing, "Santa Barbara"
Nomination, 2003, Best Writing, Passions
Nomination, 2002, Best Writing, Passions
Nomination, 2001, Best Writing, Passions
Nomination, 1999, Best Writing, Days of our Lives
Nomination, 1998, Best Writing, Days of our Lives
Nomination, 1997, Best Writing, Days of our Lives
Nomination, 1994, Best Writing, Days of our Lives

Writers Guild of America Awards
Won 1990, Best Writing, "Santa Barbara" *
Won, 1991, Best Writing, "Santa Barbara" 
Nomination, 2000, Best Writing, Passions
Won, 1999, Best Writing, Days of our Lives
Nomination, 1993, Best Writing, Days of our Lives
Nomination, 1987, Best Writing, Days of our Lives

References

External links

American soap opera writers
Living people
Columbia Pictures people
People from Memphis, Tennessee
Year of birth missing (living people)